Woodhaven Lakes is a privately owned camping resort, located in Sublette, Illinois in the United States.

Lakes in the resort
 Bass Lake (25.8 acres)
 Black Oak Lake (6.5 acres)
 Blue Gill Lake (0.5 acres) 
 Hidden Lake (1.5 acres)
 Pine Lake (2 acres)
 Sunset Lake (7.2 acres)
 Woodhaven Lake (26.8 acres)

2015 tornado
On June 22, 2015, an EF-2 tornado touched down near Sublette, Illinois before damaging  of Woodhaven Lakes campground. 5 people were injured, several hundred campers were severely damaged, and thousands of trees were uprooted. 5 days later, on June 27, campers were allowed to return to the site to assess the damages caused by the storm.

References

External links
Woodhaven Lakes

Campgrounds in Illinois
Buildings and structures in Lee County, Illinois
Reservoirs in Illinois
Bodies of water of Lee County, Illinois
Tourist attractions in Lee County, Illinois